"Storm in a Teacup" is a song written by Lynsey de Paul (credited as Lynsey Rubin) and Ron Roker, recorded by the British group The Fortunes and released as a single in 1972.

Background
The recording was arranged by Lew Warburton and produced by Roger Cook and Roger Greenaway. Rod Allen (The Fortunes bassist and vocalist) later spoke about De Paul and recalled "She was great. She kept popping into Cook's and Greenaway's office loaded with songs. One day she walked in with 'Storm' and Roger was knocked out." Indeed, Cook was so knocked out that he recommended that The Fortunes record the song.

Upon release the single reached No. 7 on the UK Singles Chart, No. 9 on the Irish Singles Chart (IRMA), No.15 on the New Zealand singles chart and No. 65 on the Australian Kent Music Report in 1972. It also spent two weeks in the Dutch Tipparade. De Paul revealed to OK! magazine in a 1996 interview that it sold three million copies. The song peaked at No. 11 on the Adelaide, Australia 5AD Official Top 40 on 12 May 1972. It was the 84th best selling single in the UK in 1972.

The song is often played on BBC Radio, most recently on the BBC Radio 2 programme The Great British Songbook. In his autobiography, John Lydon states that he loves "Storm in a Teacup", actor and singer Bradley Walsh told NME it was the first song he remembers hearing and buying, and actor John Challis stated that it was one of his favourite songs. Scottish journalist Alastair McKay describes the song as "an extraordinary thing, a swirl of pop soul". Storm in a Teacup was the name of The Fortunes album, also released in 1972 on the Capitol label.

Chart performance

Other versions
De Paul recorded her own version of the song as the B-side to her first single "Sugar Me" on the MAM record label a few months later. The single was a hit in the UK, Spain, Belgium, The Netherlands, Germany, Sweden and Australia.  This version has been included on a number of her compilation albums, starting with The World of Lynsey de Paul and most recently on the CD Sugar and Beyond. De Paul's version was also featured on the soundtrack of an episode of the German TV series Der Kommissar, entitled "Ein Mädchen nachts auf der Straße". De Paul also performed a live version of the song on the prime time BBC TV show "The Two Ronnies".

"Storm in a Teacup" has been covered by other artists, notably Springfield Revival on their 1973 album, Highlights, the Tremeloes, Tony Hatch and His Orchestra, Alan Caddy Orchestra And Singers, Steven Smith and Father, Bob Rowe, The Mike Morton Congregation, Orchester Konrad Grewe, Cliff Carpenter, folk group Just Us on their self-titled album, and also Manchester United F.C. in 1972, Brazilian groups "The Futures" and "Spirit Of Freedom", Danish singer Vojo on his 1976 Polydor album "What a Difference a Day Makes" and as the B-side to his single "Dear Son! Come Home For Christmas" as well as on the album Glory! Glory! Man. United.

Engelbert Humperdinck, de Paul's erstwhile label mate, performed his version of "Storm in a Teacup" on his show Engelbert with The Young Generation in 1972. It was also performed by Cliff Richard on episode 13 of his "It's Cliff Richard" BBC TV show.

A French language version of the song, entitled "Dans La Vie, Tout S'Arrange", was recorded by Ginette Reno and released as a single in Canada in 1972, where it peaked at #2 on the French-Canadian Top Ten, and has been included on a number of Reno compilation albums. More recently, a version of "Dans La Vie, Tout S'Arrange" by Vanessa Duchel/Maxime L was featured on the album Star Académie 2009, from the Canadian reality TV series Star Académie. The album reached No.1 on the Billboard Canadian albums chart in April 2009. On 18 April 2022, Roaddust records announced the world-wide release of "Storm In a Teacup" by Thomas Engström as a single and also that this version would appear on his upcoming album, Pure Pop.

Re-recorded versions
In 1979 The Fortunes released the EP single "Movin' Out", written by Billy Joel, which featured a new version of "Storm in a Teacup" as the second track on the B-side. This was followed by the 1982 release by The Fortunes of a new and updated version of the song, taken from their album Their Golden Hits, as a single on the Phillips. De Paul also recorded an updated version of the song as a track on her 1994 album, Just a Little Time.

References

1972 songs
1972 singles
Capitol Records singles
Philips Records singles
The Fortunes songs
Songs written by Lynsey de Paul
Songs written by Ron Roker